Rosanna Vaudetti is a television host and announcer for RAI.

Vaudetti was born on 19 December 1937 in Ancona. She was educated at the University of Turin where she was appointed by Radiotelevisione Italiana around late 1960 and became a television announcer for Secondo Programma in 1961. Vaudetti hosted the Italian game show Games Without Frontiers in the 1970s; she was the Italian commentator for the Eurovision Song Contest seven times and the Italian spokesperson in the contest three times. She was married to television director .

In April 1999 Vaudetti was appointed Commander of the Italian Republic.

Rosanna Vaudetti is Roman Catholic.

References

External links 
  TV Blog of Rosanna Vaudetti

1937 births
Living people
Italian television presenters
Italian women television presenters
Radio and television announcers
People from Ancona
Italian Roman Catholics